Thomas Henry Taylor (born 22 May 1973) is a British children's writer and illustrator. He studied at Anglia Ruskin University. He painted the cover art for the first edition of Harry Potter and the Philosopher's Stone. Due to the number of questions regarding the identity of the wizard illustrated on the back cover of the first edition of Harry Potter and the Philosopher's Stone, and thanks to the contribution of an Argentine named Alfonso Ferrer in Taylor's blog, in February 2016, he decided to name him Robertus Tallis.

He attended the Norwich School of Art and Design. Then he spent three years at art school in Cambridge. After finishing his education he found his first job at Heffer’s Children’s Bookshop. In his spare time he was looking for something that was close to his desires - book illustrations. And in about a year he was offered to do a book cover by Bloomsbury Publishing. It happened to be the first book by J. K. Rowling about Harry Potter. And along with books illustrations he began writing books for children by himself and soon found out that it was much of his interest and really a work that he was always dreaming about. And his childhood desire to see ghosts' world at last could be realized in writing books, because everything is possible in stories. That is how he lived his idea in Haunters, his "first novel for early teens".

He has written and illustrated several picture books, starting with George and Sophie's Museum Adventure in 1999, and has two children's novels, Haunters and Dan of the Dead. The first one was published in May, 2012 by The Chicken House and the last one was published on 1 June 2012 by  Bloomsbury Publishing PLC. Dan of the Dead sequel named Dan and the Caverns of Bone was issued in June, 2013. The book The Pets You Get with his illustrations won the Stockport Schools’ Book Award in 2013 (early years category) and also the Oldham Brilliant Books Award.

Picture books
 George and Sophie's Museum Adventure (1999)
 The Chocolate Biscuit Tree (2001)
 The Loudest Roar (2002)
 The Biggest Splash (2005)
 The Noisiest Night (2007)
 Jack's Tractor (2009)
 Little Mouse and the Big Cupcake (2010)
 The Pets You Get (2012)
 Too Many Tickles (2013)

Fiction
 Haunters (2012)
 Dan and the Dead (2012)
 Dan and the Caverns of Bone (2013)
 Malamander (2019)
 Gargantis (2020)
 Shadowghast (2021)
 Festergrimm (2022)

References

External links

 
 Taylor at United Agents 
 
 

British children's writers
British children's book illustrators
Living people
Place of birth missing (living people)
1973 births